The Men's 2014 European Union Amateur Boxing Championships was held at the Sofia Sport Hall in Sofia, Bulgaria from 8 to 16 August. The 8th edition of the competition was organised by the European governing body for amateur boxing, the European Boxing Confederation.

Medal winners

Medal table

References

External links
 Results

2009 European Union Amateur Boxing Championships
European Union Amateur Boxing Championships
2014 European Union Amateur Boxing Championships
August 2014 sports events in Europe
European Union Amateur Boxing Championships